Friedrich Carl Bartholomae (29 October 1886 – 12 September 1915) was a German rower who competed for the German Empire in the 1912 Summer Olympics. The German team won the bronze medal in the eight. He was killed in action during World War I.

1912 German Men's eights rowing team
Otto Liebing
Max Bröske
Fritz Bartholomae
Willi Bartholomae
Werner Dehn
Rudolf Reichelt
Hans Matthiae
Kurt Runge
Max Vetter

See also
 List of Olympians killed in World War I

References

1886 births
1915 deaths
German military personnel killed in World War I
Rowers at the 1912 Summer Olympics
Olympic rowers of Germany
Olympic bronze medalists for Germany
Olympic medalists in rowing
German male rowers
Medalists at the 1912 Summer Olympics
Sportspeople from Krefeld